Röderaue is a municipality in the district of Meißen (Meissen), in Saxony, Germany.

Röderaue includes the following subdivisions:
Frauenhain
Koselitz
Pulsen
Raden

References 

Meissen (district)